Conasprella boholensis is a species of sea snail, a marine gastropod mollusk in the family Conidae, the cone snails and their allies.

Like all species within the genus Conasprella, these snails are predatory and venomous. They are capable of "stinging" humans, therefore live ones should be handled carefully or not at all.

Description
Original description: "Shell thin, delicate, glossy; outline straight sided, very elongate, tapering to anterior end; shoulder sharp, extremely carinate, bladelike; slight constriction just anterior to shoulder carina; early whorls strongly coronate; spire whorls excavated because of well developed carina;  spire scalariform with carinae of previous whorls projecting beyond suture; body whorl sculpture consisting of 25-35 deeply incised spiral sulci; spire smooth with only faint radiating growth lines extending from suture to carina; color pure white with scattered red-brown dashes; spire color white with only a few scattered, crescent-shaped, red-brown flammules; aperture white; periostracum unknown."

The size of the shell varies between 22 mm and 51 mm.

Distribution
Locus typicus: "Approximately 250 metres depth off Panglao, 
Bohol Isl., Philippines."

This marine species occurs off Somalia, the Philippines, Vietnam, 
New Caledonia and off Western Australia.

References

 Petuch, E.J. 1979. Twelve new Indo-Pacific gastropods. Nemouria 23: 1–20
 Tucker J.K. & Tenorio M.J. (2009) Systematic classification of Recent and fossil conoidean gastropods. Hackenheim: Conchbooks. 296 pp.
  Puillandre N., Duda T.F., Meyer C., Olivera B.M. & Bouchet P. (2015). One, four or 100 genera? A new classification of the cone snails. Journal of Molluscan Studies. 81: 1–23

External links
 The Conus Biodiversity website
Cone Shells – Knights of the Sea
 

boholensis
Gastropods described in 1979